Petar "Pero" Strugar (born 23 May 1988) is a Serbian actor and presenter.

Personal life
Strugar is a close friend to fellow actor and Montevideo, God Bless You! co-star Miloš Biković. Petar was married to actress Ivana Nikolic from 2013-2015 and have one son together. Later he was in relationship with famous and one of the most popular young Serbian singer Milica Todorović and after breakup he get into relationship with new girlfriend Olja which gives him son 2021.

Filmography

Serbian dubs

References

External links
 

Montenegrin male actors
Serbian male film actors
Serbian male television actors
Serbian television presenters
1988 births
Living people
People from Cetinje
21st-century Montenegrin male actors